In computer science, formal methods are mathematically rigorous techniques for the specification, development, analysis, and verification of software and hardware systems. The use of formal methods for software and hardware design is motivated by the expectation that, as in other engineering disciplines, performing appropriate mathematical analysis can contribute to the reliability and robustness of a design.

Formal methods employ a variety of theoretical computer science fundamentals, including logic calculi, formal languages, automata theory, control theory, program semantics, type systems, and type theory.

Background
Semi-formal methods are formalisms and languages that are not considered fully "formal". It defers the task of completing the semantics to a later stage, which is then done either by human interpretation or by interpretation through software like code or test case generators.

Taxonomy

Formal methods can be used at a number of levels:

 Level 0: Formal specification may be undertaken and then a program developed from this informally. This has been dubbed formal methods lite. This may be the most cost-effective option in many cases.
 Level 1: Formal development and formal verification may be used to produce a program in a more formal manner. For example, proofs of properties or refinement from the specification to a program may be undertaken. This may be most appropriate in high-integrity systems involving safety or security.
 Level 2: Theorem provers may be used to undertake fully formal machine-checked proofs. Despite improving tools and declining costs, this can be very expensive and is only practically worthwhile if the cost of mistakes is very high (e.g., in critical parts of operating system or microprocessor design).

Further information on this is expanded below.

As with programming language semantics, styles of formal methods may be roughly classified as follows:

 Denotational semantics, in which the meaning of a system is expressed in the mathematical theory of domains.  Proponents of such methods rely on the well-understood nature of domains to give meaning to the system; critics point out that not every system may be intuitively or naturally viewed as a function.
 Operational semantics, in which the meaning of a system is expressed as a sequence of actions of a (presumably) simpler computational model. Proponents of such methods point to the simplicity of their models as a means to expressive clarity; critics counter that the problem of semantics has just been delayed (who defines the semantics of the simpler model?).
 Axiomatic semantics, in which the meaning of the system is expressed in terms of preconditions and postconditions which are true before and after the system performs a task, respectively. Proponents note the connection to classical logic; critics note that such semantics never really describe what a system does (merely what is true before and afterwards).

Lightweight formal methods
Some practitioners believe that the formal methods community has overemphasized full formalization of a specification or design. They contend that the expressiveness of the languages involved, as well as the complexity of the systems being modelled, make full formalization a difficult and expensive task. As an alternative, various lightweight formal methods, which emphasize partial specification and focused application, have been proposed. Examples of this lightweight approach to formal methods include the Alloy object modelling notation, Denney's synthesis of some aspects of the Z notation with use case driven development, and the CSK VDM Tools.

Uses

Formal methods can be applied at various points through the development process.

Specification
Formal methods may be used to give a description of the system to be developed, at whatever level(s) of detail desired. This formal description can be used to guide further development activities (see following sections); additionally, it can be used to verify that the requirements for the system being developed have been completely and accurately specified, or formalising system requirements by expressing them in a formal language with a precise and unambiguously defined syntax and semantics.

The need for formal specification systems has been noted for years. In the ALGOL 58 report, John Backus presented a formal notation for describing programming language syntax, later named Backus normal form then renamed Backus–Naur form (BNF). Backus also wrote that a formal description of the meaning of syntactically valid ALGOL programs wasn't completed in time for inclusion in the report. "Therefore the formal treatment of the semantics of legal programs will be included in a subsequent paper." It never appeared.

Development
Formal development is the use of formal methods as an integrated part of a tool-supported system development process.

Once a formal specification has been produced, the specification may be used as a guide while the concrete system is developed during the design process (i.e., realized typically in software, but also potentially in hardware). For example:

 If the formal specification is in operational semantics, the observed behavior of the concrete system can be compared with the behavior of the specification (which itself should be executable or simulatable). Additionally, the operational commands of the specification may be amenable to direct translation into executable code.
 If the formal specification is in axiomatic semantics, the preconditions and postconditions of the specification may become assertions in the executable code.

Verification

Formal verification is the use of software tools to prove properties of a formal specification, or to prove that a formal model of a system implementation satisfies its specification.

Once a formal specification has been developed, the specification may be used as the basis for proving properties of the specification, and by inference, properties of the system implementation.

Sign-off verification 
Sign-off verification is the use of a formal verification tool that is highly trusted.  Such a tool can replace traditional verification methods (the tool may even be certified).

Human-directed proof
Sometimes, the motivation for proving the correctness of a system is not the obvious need for reassurance of the correctness of the system, but a desire to understand the system better. Consequently, some proofs of correctness are produced in the style of mathematical proof: handwritten (or typeset) using natural language, using a level of informality common to such proofs. A "good" proof is one that is readable and understandable by other human readers.

Critics of such approaches point out that the ambiguity inherent in natural language allows errors to be undetected in such proofs; often, subtle errors can be present in the low-level details typically overlooked by such proofs. Additionally, the work involved in producing such a good proof requires a high level of mathematical sophistication and expertise.

Automated proof
In contrast, there is increasing interest in producing proofs of correctness of such systems by automated means. Automated techniques fall into three general categories:
 Automated theorem proving, in which a system attempts to produce a formal proof from scratch, given a description of the system, a set of logical axioms, and a set of inference rules.
 Model checking, in which a system verifies certain properties by means of an exhaustive search of all possible states that a system could enter during its execution.
 Abstract interpretation, in which a system verifies an over-approximation of a behavioural property of the program, using a fixpoint computation over a (possibly complete) lattice representing it.

Some automated theorem provers require guidance as to which properties are "interesting" enough to pursue, while others work without human intervention. Model checkers can quickly get bogged down in checking millions of uninteresting states if not given a sufficiently abstract model.

Proponents of such systems argue that the results have greater mathematical certainty than human-produced proofs, since all the tedious details have been algorithmically verified. The training required to use such systems is also less than that required to produce good mathematical proofs by hand, making the techniques accessible to a wider variety of practitioners.

Critics note that some of those systems are like oracles: they make a pronouncement of truth, yet give no explanation of that truth. There is also the problem of "verifying the verifier"; if the program which aids in the verification is itself unproven, there may be reason to doubt the soundness of the produced results. Some modern model checking tools produce a "proof log" detailing each step in their proof, making it possible to perform, given suitable tools, independent verification.

The main feature of the abstract interpretation approach is that it provides a sound analysis, i.e. no false negatives are returned. Moreover, it is efficiently scalable, by tuning the abstract domain representing the property to be analyzed, and by applying widening operators to get fast convergence.

Applications
Formal methods are applied in different areas of hardware and software, including routers, Ethernet switches, routing protocols, security applications, and operating system microkernels such as seL4. There are several examples in which they have been used to verify the functionality of the hardware and software used in DCs. IBM used ACL2, a theorem prover, in the AMD x86 processor development process. Intel uses such methods to verify its hardware and firmware (permanent software programmed into a read-only memory). Dansk Datamatik Center used formal methods in the 1980s to develop a compiler system for the Ada programming language that went on to become a long-lived commercial product.

There are several other projects of NASA in which formal methods are applied, such as Next Generation Air Transportation System, Unmanned Aircraft System integration in National Airspace System, and Airborne Coordinated Conflict Resolution and Detection (ACCoRD).
B-Method with Atelier B, is used to develop safety automatisms for the various subways installed throughout the world by Alstom and Siemens, and also for Common Criteria certification and the development of system models by ATMEL and STMicroelectronics.

Formal verification has been frequently used in hardware by most of the well-known hardware vendors, such as IBM, Intel, and AMD. There are many areas of hardware, where Intel have used FMs to verify the working of the products, such as parameterized verification of cache-coherent protocol, Intel Core i7 processor execution engine validation  (using theorem proving, BDDs, and symbolic evaluation), optimization for Intel IA-64 architecture using HOL light theorem prover, and verification of high-performance dual-port gigabit Ethernet controller with support for PCI express protocol and Intel advance management technology using Cadence. Similarly, IBM has used formal methods in the verification of power gates, registers, and functional verification of the IBM Power7 microprocessor.

In software development
In software development, formal methods are mathematical approaches to solving software (and hardware) problems at the requirements, specification, and design levels. Formal methods are most likely to be applied to safety-critical or security-critical software and systems, such as avionics software. Software safety assurance standards, such as DO-178C allows the usage of formal methods through supplementation, and Common Criteria mandates formal methods at the highest levels of categorization.

For sequential software, examples of formal methods include the B-Method, the specification languages used in automated theorem proving, RAISE, and the Z notation.

In functional programming, property-based testing has allowed the mathematical specification and testing (if not exhaustive testing) of the expected behaviour of individual functions.

The Object Constraint Language (and specializations such as Java Modeling Language) has allowed object-oriented systems to be formally specified, if not necessarily formally verified.

For concurrent software and systems, Petri nets, process algebra, and finite state machines (which are based on automata theory - see also virtual finite state machine or event driven finite state machine) allow executable software specification and can be used to build up and validate application behaviour.

Another approach to formal methods in software development is to write a specification in some form of logic—usually a variation of first-order logic (FOL)—and then to directly execute the logic as though it were a program. The OWL language, based on Description Logic (DL), is an example. There is also work on mapping some version of English (or another natural language) automatically to and from logic, as well as executing the logic directly. Examples are Attempto Controlled English, and Internet Business Logic, which do not seek to control the vocabulary or syntax. A feature of systems that support bidirectional English-logic mapping and direct execution of the logic is that they can be made to explain their results, in English, at the business or scientific level.

Formal methods and notations
There are a variety of formal methods and notations available.

Specification languages
 Abstract State Machines (ASMs)
 A Computational Logic for Applicative Common Lisp (ACL2)
 Actor model
 Alloy
 ANSI/ISO C Specification Language (ACSL)
 Autonomic System Specification Language (ASSL)
 B-Method
 CADP
 Common Algebraic Specification Language (CASL)
 Esterel
 Java Modeling Language (JML)
 Knowledge Based Software Assistant (KBSA)
 Lustre
 mCRL2
 Perfect Developer
 Petri nets
 Predicative programming
 Process calculi
 CSP
 LOTOS
 π-calculus
 RAISE
 Rebeca Modeling Language
 SPARK Ada
 Specification and Description Language
 TLA+
 USL
 VDM
 VDM-SL
 VDM++
 Z notation

Model checkers

 ESBMC
 MALPAS Software Static Analysis Toolset – an industrial-strength model checker used for formal proof of safety-critical systems
 PAT – a free model checker, simulator and refinement checker for concurrent systems and CSP extensions (e.g., shared variables, arrays, fairness)
 SPIN
 UPPAAL

Organizations

 BCS-FACS
 Formal Methods Europe
 Z User Group

See also
 Abstract interpretation
 Automated theorem proving
 Design by contract
 Formal methods people
 Formal specification
 Formal verification
 Formal system
 Model checking
 Software engineering
 Specification language

References

Further reading

 Jonathan P. Bowen and Michael G. Hinchey, Formal Methods. In Allen B. Tucker, Jr. (ed.), Computer Science Handbook, 2nd edition, Section XI, Software Engineering, Chapter 106, pages 106-1 – 106-25, Chapman & Hall / CRC Press, Association for Computing Machinery, 2004.
 Hubert Garavel (editor) and Susanne Graf. Formal Methods for Safe and Secure Computer Systems. Bundesamt für Sicherheit in der Informationstechnik, BSI study 875, Bonn, Germany, December 2013.
 * Michael G. Hinchey, Jonathan P. Bowen, and Emil Vassev, Formal Methods. In Philip A. Laplante (ed.), Encyclopedia of Software Engineering, Taylor & Francis, 2010, pages 308–320.
 Marieke Huisman, Dilian Gurov, and Alexander Malkis, Formal Methods: From Academia to Industrial Practice – A Travel Guide, arXiv:2002.07279, 2020.
 
 Jean François Monin and Michael G. Hinchey, Understanding formal methods, Springer, 2003, .

External links
 Formal Methods Europe (FME)
 Formal Methods Wiki
 Formal methods from Foldoc
Archival material
 Formal method keyword on Microsoft Academic Search via Archive.org
 Evidence on Formal Methods uses and impact on Industry supported by the DEPLOY project (EU FP7) in Archive.org

 
Software development philosophies
Theoretical computer science
Specification languages